SMS Württemberg was the fourth and final member of the  dreadnought battleships ordered but never finished for the German Kaiserliche Marine (Imperial Navy) in the 1910s, sometimes considered to be part of a sub-class with her sister . She was to be armed with the same main battery of eight  guns in four gun turrets. Originally intended to serve as a fleet flagship, the start of World War I in July 1914 forced the Navy to simplify her design in the hopes that she could be completed in time to see service during the conflict. She was laid down in January 1915 at the Germaniawerft shipyard, but as resources were diverted to more pressing projects, including U-boat construction, work on the ship slowed; she was launched in June 1917, but only to clear the slipway for other work. By the time construction stopped, she was about twelve months from completion. The Treaty of Versailles that ended the war in June 1919 specified that all warships under construction in Germany were to be destroyed, and Württemberg was accordingly sold for scrap in 1921 and dismantled the following year.

Development

Design work on the  began in 1910 in the context of the Anglo-German naval arms race, with initial discussions focused on the caliber of the main battery; previous German battleships had carried  guns, but as foreign navies adopted  and  weapons, the German naval command felt the need to respond with larger guns of their own. Admiral Alfred von Tirpitz, the State Secretary of the Reichsmarineamt (RMA—Imperial Naval Office), was able to use public outcry over the Agadir Crisis to pressure the Reichstag (Imperial Diet) into appropriating additional funds for the Kaiserliche Marine (Imperial Navy) to offset the additional cost of the larger weapons. The design staff settled on the 38 cm caliber since the 40 cm was significantly more expensive and the 38 cm gun marked a significant improvement over existing German guns. The class was authorized under the fourth and final Naval Law, which was passed in 1912.

This prompted them to alter the third member of the class, to include a diesel engine. As work began on Württemberg, the last member of the class, the designers intended to retain the increased dimensions while reverting to an all-steam turbine arrangement. The savings in weight would be used to improve Württembergs armor layout. This proved to be impossible, because the decision was made to outfit the new vessel as a fleet flagship, and the larger bridge necessary for an admiral's staff more than offset the reduction in weight. Indeed, the alterations forced the design staff to increase standard displacement by another 200 t. Cost of the new ships spiraled higher and higher; Württemberg amounted to an 8.6 percent increase over Sachsen, which was in turn a 13 percent increase over the estimated costs for Bayern and Baden.

Tirpitz presented the finalized design for the new ship to Kaiser Wilhelm II for approval in June 1914, during the Kiel Week sailing regatta, calculated to take advantage of Wilhelm's good mood to secure his approval for the skyrocketing price. Wilhelm registered no objection, but events were to rapidly force Tirpitz to rework the design. Later that month, Archduke Franz Ferdinand of Austria-Hungary was assassinated, leading to the July Crisis that started World War I in late July. On 2 August, Tirpitz issued instructions that Württemberg was to be completed as quickly as possible to strengthen the fleet now that the country was at war; the ship was to be completed identically to Sachsen, albeit without the diesel engine, discarding the modifications to her bridge structure. The contract for the ship was quickly awarded to AG Vulcan.

Description

Though her sister Sachsen was to receive a diesel engine, Württemberg reverted to an all-steam turbine propulsion system like her earlier sisters. Steam for the engines was provided by nine coal-fired and three oil-burning water-tube boilers. Upon commissioning, she would have carried a crew of 42 officers and 1,129 enlisted men.

Had she been completed, the ship would have been armed with eight  SK L/45 guns. These would have been arranged in four twin-gun turrets: two superfiring turret pairs fore and aft of the superstructure. Her secondary armament was to have consisted of sixteen  guns and four  guns. She would also have been fitted with five  torpedo tubes submerged in her hull, one in the bow and two on each broadside.

Construction and cancellation
  

Württemberg, ordered under the provisional name Ersatz Kaiser Wilhelm II to replace the old pre-dreadnought , was named for the earlier ironclad corvette , which had been built in the 1870s. The ship had been scheduled for the 1915 fiscal year, but due to the start of the war, she was begun early using war funds. The contract that had been awarded to AG Vulcan was finalized on 29 December 1914, which specified the beginning of construction in January 1915, her launching in mid-1916, and completion in early 1917. Her keel was laid down in Hamburg on 4 January 1915 under yard number 386, and AG Vulcan intended to rush work on the ship as much as possible. But as resources and manpower were diverted to other, more pressing projects like the U-boat campaign against Britain, work on the ship slowed.

By December 1915, about 31 percent of her hull had been completed, which amounted to 60 percent of her outer hull plating below the waterline, 75 percent of her inner bottom, and 50 percent of her lower decks and bulkheads below the armor deck. Work on assembling her propulsion system had begun in the workshop alongside the slipway, as had the manufacturing of her armor plate. Further work on the hull proceeded more slowly in 1916, and her launching date was repeatedly delayed until she finally was ready to exit the slipway on 20 June 1917, a year behind schedule. By that time, there was no intention to complete the ship, and her launching was primarily intended to clear the slipway for other projects.

After Germany resumed and greatly expanded the unrestricted submarine warfare campaign in February 1917, Admiral Eduard von Capelle, who had by then replaced Tirpitz as the head of the RMA, argued that capital ship construction should be halted in favor of U-boat construction. The RMA filed a report dated 1February 1918, which stated that capital ship construction had stopped, primarily due to the shifting priorities to the U-boat war. When work stopped on Württemberg altogether, she was about twelve months from completion. The eight 38 cm guns that had been manufactured for Württemberg were instead converted into railway guns or fixed batteries in Flanders. The incomplete vessel was still in AG Vulcan's possession at the end of the war in November 1918. According to Article 186 of the Treaty of Versailles, signed in June 1919, all German surface warships under construction were to be immediately broken up for scrap. Württemberg was accordingly stricken from the naval register on 3 November 1919 and sold to ship breakers in 1921, thereafter being dismantled in Hamburg.

Notes

Footnotes

Citations

References

Further reading
 

Bayern-class battleships
1917 ships
Ships built in Hamburg
World War I battleships of Germany